Hemming Gadh (c. 1450 – 16 December 1520) was a Swedish Roman Catholic priest and Bishop of the Diocese of Linköping.
He was a staunch ally of Sten Sture and a fierce opponent of Denmark and the Kalmar Union.

Biography 

Hemming Olofsson Gadh was born around 1450 at  Hossmo parish in  Kalmar County, Sweden. He studied legal and ecclesiastical law at the University of Greifswald and   University of Rostock. In 1479 he became chancellor and secretary for Henrik Tidemansson, Bishop of the Diocese of Linköping. Gadh was later that year selected by Sten Sture the Elder  as an envoy in Rome.

He was a master in gaining well paid posts, which he did not take up, but rather sold for a good price. He did however choose to take up his new position when  at the request of Sten Sture, he was  elected as bishop of the Diocese of Linköping after his predecessor Henrik Tidemansson died in 1501.

He did not manage to get the post confirmed by the Pope within the statuted three months. This had as a consequence the Spanish cardinal Jacoubs Serra appointed as administrator. In 1506 Gadh was excommunicated by the Pope and in 1513 Hans Brask (1464–1538) gained the position as bishop.

During the Dano-Swedish War (1501–1512) he led troops against Kalmar and worked as a Swedish ambassador in Lübeck between 1510 and 1512.
He was captured by the Danes in October 1518. He was on King Christian II's fleet to Stockholm in 1520 and played a role in allowing the Danes entrance to the city. However the King did not trust the excommunicated bishop. After the Stockholm massacre, he was taken to Raseborg Castle in Finland where he was beheaded by order of King Christian II of Denmark

References

1450s births
1520 deaths
People excommunicated by the Catholic Church
Swedish politicians
Executed Swedish people
People executed by the Kalmar Union
15th-century Swedish people
16th-century Swedish politicians
People executed by Denmark by decapitation
16th-century Roman Catholic bishops in Sweden
Bishops of Linköping
16th-century executions by Denmark
Papal chamberlains